Colonel Goshu Wolde (born 1942) is a former Ethiopian Foreign Minister and worked as minister of education, of Ethiopia from 1983 to 1986. Wolde, formerly a foreign minister under Mengistu, resigned the Mengistu government in 1986, by sending his resignation letter from New York City to Ethiopian Head of State Mengistu Haile Mariam, stating dictatorship, cruelty and deterioration of Revolution in his letter, and established himself in United States in opposition to the Mengistu Government In the year 1992, Wolde founded the Ethiopian Medhin Democratic Party, in Washington D.C. He made a famous speech to the US Senate Committee for Foreign Affairs in 1991 and that speech is still shared and discussed by millions of Ethiopians.
Wolde was the leader of two foreign based group movements, the shadowy Free Soldiers Movement and the Ethiopian Movement for Democracy, Peace and Unity.

Early life 
Goshu Wolde, was born in 1942 in Gore, Illubabor Province to a poor family. He did his primary schooling in Gore, while he completed his secondary schooling from Addis Ababa. Wolde attended Military academy in the years 1960-1963. He was awarded with military award, sword of honor, as he completed his military subjects as a topper. He joined Addis Ababa University received Bachelor of Laws (LL.B.) and later attended the Yale University graduated with Mater of Law (LL.M.).  Wolde served as the chairman of National Literacy Campaign Coordinating Committee, in the year 1979, which was formed by the Derg to combat the low illiteracy rate of Ethiopia in year 1974.

Minister of Foreign Affairs 
In a United Nations meeting in Geneva on African famine in 1985, the then Vice President of America, George H. W. Bush, had negotiated Food for the North Initiative  with the then Ethiopian Foreign Minister Goshu Wolde.
Wolde reportedly had accused Bush criticism of the Ethiopian Government Famine Relief efforts, as personal political motivations. Wolde has raised his concerns about famine donations raised in Europe and America in form of food, clothing, equipments, money and that the donations were not reaching Ethiopian Government. He had asked West donations to be provided to Ethiopian Government directly instead of routing through private agencies.

Following the rebel take over in May 1991 by the EPRDF, Wolde Goshu warned that a lasting peace would not develop unless a broad transitional government was established in which the Amhara ethnic group was adequately represented.

Exile
On 21-22 March 1992, the Ethiopian Movement for Democracy, Peace and Unity (EMDPU) led by Goshu Wolde was launched as a political organisation in exile, opposed to the EPRDF regime.

See also 
 1983–1985 famine in Ethiopia

References

1942 births
Living people
Foreign ministers of Ethiopia
Government ministers of Ethiopia
Date of birth missing (living people)
20th-century Ethiopian politicians
Addis Ababa University alumni
Yale Law School alumni